Confide in Me is a compilation album by Australian recording artist Kylie Minogue, which was released in November 2001. The album consists of both studio albums released by her former record label Deconstruction Records, which are Kylie Minogue and Impossible Princess. However, her single "Breathe" was not featured on the album. The album was ineligible to chart on the main U.K. albums chart due to being considered a budget album, but had a chart run on the Budget Albums Chart from 2002 to 2005, peaking at #4 in 2003. It received mixed reviews from music critics; whilst they praised the tracks from Deconstruction Records, they lost interest in the project as the album was too similar to the compilation album Hits+ which only featured Deconstruction songs also, although that one also included various "rarities" when this one solely includes album tracks.

Background
Prior to being signed to Minogue's current label Parlophone, her previous labels had decided to release material from her previous records. Confide in Me was released by BMG, along with her other compilation album's Hits+ (2000), Greatest Hits 87-92 (2002), Greatest Hits 87–97 (2002) and Artist Collection (2004). Ultimately, neither of the compilations achieved high success but Hits+ charted in the UK, while both Greatest Hits album charted in UK, Ireland and Japan.

The cover artwork uses pictures from the videos to "Breathe" and "Some Kind of Bliss".

Reception

Confide in Me received mixed reviews from music critics. No explanatory reviews have been released, but at AllMusic, they had highlighted "Some Kind of Bliss", "Time Will Pass You By" and "Confide in Me" as album highlights. Critics praised the album for its Deconstruction tracks, but felt it received no success because it was too similar to the album Hits+. A review from Cduniverse was review as well. She had explained "Fans of those albums should consider checking out Confide in Me; while it doesn't feature the previously unreleased tracks that Hits + does, it does provide a more in-depth look at her two transitional albums."

The album was certified Silver by British Phonographic Industry (BPI), for shipments of 60,000 copies.

Track listing

Personnel 
Kylie Minogue – Vocals
Dave Ball – Producer
James Dean Bradfield – Producer
Brothers in Rhythm – Producer
Rob Dougan – Producer
Dave Eringa – Producer
Jimmy Harry – Arranger, Producer
Pete Heller – Producer
M People – Producer
Ingo Vauk – Producer

Certifications

References

Kylie Minogue compilation albums
2002 compilation albums
Contemporary R&B compilation albums
House music compilation albums